Thomas William “Tiger” Lynch (26 March 1892 – 6 May 1950) was a New Zealand rugby union player. He played 23 matches for the All Blacks including four internationals, scoring 37 tries in all.

During World War I, Lynch enlisted in the New Zealand Expeditionary Force in May 1915 and served firstly with the New Zealand Medical Corps on the hospital ship Marama, and later as a private in the Canterbury Infantry Regiment. He was wounded in action, receiving a gunshot wound to the shoulder, on 8 October 1918.

Lynch died at Clyde on 6 May 1950, and was buried at Alexandra Cemetery.

References

1892 births
1950 deaths
People from Milton, New Zealand
People educated at St. Patrick's College, Wellington
New Zealand rugby union players
New Zealand international rugby union players
South Canterbury rugby union players
Southland rugby union players
Rugby union wings
New Zealand military personnel of World War I
Rugby union players from Otago